Edward James Tuohill (19 January 1916 – 29 March 2005) was an Australian rules footballer who played with Carlton and Geelong in the Victorian Football League (VFL).

Notes

External links 

Ted Tuohill's profile at Blueseum

1916 births
2005 deaths
Carlton Football Club players
Geelong Football Club players
Australian rules footballers from Victoria (Australia)